Dariusz Jan Gęsior (born 9 October 1969 in Chorzów) is a retired Polish footballer and current manager who manages the Polish under-15 national team.

Career

Club
He is one of the most notable players of Ruch Chorzów. His last club was Dyskobolia Grodzisk Wielkopolski, which he left in late 2006. His nickname is Gąska.

National team
He was a member of Olympic Poland national football team participated in Olympic Games 1992. He played 22 caps and scored once for the Poland national football team.

References

External links 
 
 Dariusz Gesior at Footballdatabase

1969 births
Living people
Polish footballers
Poland international footballers
Ruch Chorzów players
Widzew Łódź players
Wisła Płock players
Pogoń Szczecin players
Dyskobolia Grodzisk Wielkopolski players
Ekstraklasa players
Olympic silver medalists for Poland
Footballers at the 1992 Summer Olympics
Olympic footballers of Poland
Sportspeople from Chorzów
Olympic medalists in football
Medalists at the 1992 Summer Olympics
Association football defenders
Polish football managers